Christina Dickebohm (born 17 February 1982) is a volleyball player from Germany.

She represented her native country at the 2003 Women's European Volleyball Championship, finishing third. 
On club level she played with USC Munster.

Honours
 2003 European Championship — 3rd place

References

External links 
https://www.noz.de/archiv/vermischtes/artikel/148605/in-der-spitze-mitspielen
https://www.noz.de/archiv/vermischtes/artikel/339467/christina-bei-der-em-quali
https://www.noz.de/archiv/vermischtes/artikel/360134/fangt-niemals-an-aufzuhoren-und-hort-nie-auf-anzufangen

German women's volleyball players
1982 births
Living people